Geraesta is a genus of African crab spiders that was first described by Eugène Louis Simon in 1889.

Species
 it contains six species, found in Africa:
Geraesta ansieae Benjamin, 2015 – Rwanda
Geraesta congoensis (Lessert, 1943) – Ivory Coast, Congo, Botswana, South Africa
Geraesta hirta Simon, 1889 (type) – Comoros, Madagascar
Geraesta lehtineni Benjamin, 2011 – Madagascar
Geraesta mkwawa Benjamin, 2011 – Tanzania
Geraesta octolobata (Simon, 1886) – Madagascar

In synonymy:
G. bilobata Simon, 1897 = Geraesta hirta Simon, 1889

See also
 List of Thomisidae species

References

Further reading

Araneomorphae genera
Spiders of Africa
Thomisidae